The Lake Rukwa sardine (Chelaethiops rukwaensis) is an African  species of freshwater fish in the family Cyprinidae.
It is found only in Tanzania.
Its natural habitat is freshwater lakes.
It is threatened by habitat loss.

References

Chelaethiops
Fish described in 1939
Taxa named by Kate Bertram
Taxonomy articles created by Polbot